The Sellyakh ( or Сельлях; , Sielleex) is a river in the Sakha Republic (Yakutia), Russia.

The river flows north of the Arctic Circle, across territories of the Ust-Yansky District marked by permafrost. The lower course of the river belongs to the Yana Delta Ramsar wetland site. There are no settlements along its course. The nearest town is Tumat.

Course
The Sellyakh has its sources in the western part of the Yana-Indigirka Lowland, East Siberian Lowland. The Sellyakh flows roughly northwestwards across very swampy flatland dotted with small lakes, to the northeast of the Nuchcha. Its channel meanders strongly and in its lower course the river turns north, its floodplain roughly parallel to the Chondon that flows northwards to the west. Finally the river ends in the Sellyakh Bay of the Laptev Sea. It shares a common mouth system with the  Bilir, to the southwest of the mouth of the Danilkina.

Tributaries  
There are over 6,000 lakes in the Sellyakh basin. The river is frozen between early October and early June.

See also
List of rivers of Russia

References

External links 
Fishing & Tourism in Yakutia

Drainage basins of the Laptev Sea
Rivers of the Sakha Republic
East Siberian Lowland